WMTX (100.7 FM) is a commercial radio station in Tampa, Florida, known as "Mix 100.7". It has an adult contemporary radio format, switching to Christmas music for much of November and December.  It is owned by iHeartMedia, Inc., with its studios and offices on Gandy Boulevard in Tampa. WMTX serves as the primary Emergency Alert System station for the Tampa Bay area.

WMTX has an effective radiated power (ERP) of 100,000 watts.  The transmitter site is off Rhodine Road in Riverview.  WMTX broadcasts using HD Radio technology; its HD-2 digital subchannel airs a simulcast of WHNZ's Spanish-language news/talk format, while their HD-3 subchannel carries "Up! Tampa Bay," a Contemporary Christian format.

Station history

CBS programming and Beautiful music
In November 1947, the station signed on the air as WDAE-FM.  It originally broadcast at 105.7 MHz and was powered at only 1,000 watts, a fraction of its current output.  It simulcast co-owned WDAE (1250 AM) and the two stations were owned by the Tampa Times newspaper.   WDAE-AM-FM were CBS Radio Network affiliates, running its dramas, comedies, news, sports and other programming during the Golden Age of Radio.  The station carried the WATL call sign from 1966 to 1968, returning to WDAE-FM after two years.

In the late 1960s, WDAE-FM flipped to beautiful music, airing quarter hour sweeps of mostly instrumental cover versions of popular songs, as well as Broadway and Hollywood show tunes.  To give it a separate identity from its AM sister station, which aired teen-oriented Top 40 music, the FM station changed its call letters to WAVV in 1976, to represent the word "Wave."  During the WAVV years, the station's tagline was "Waves of Beautiful Music". In 1978, the call sign changed to WJYW, to represent the word "Joy."

Adult contemporary
In 1982, the station flipped from beautiful music to adult contemporary music and the call sign changed to WIQI ("W-101"). In 1986, the call sign changed to WUSA-FM (named after Washington D.C. CBS television station WUSA-TV since June 1986), while still being named "W-101" before rebranding as simply "101 WUSA" in July 1994.

In December 1996, after Gannett traded the station to Jacor, the station flipped to hot adult contemporary and rebranded as "Kiss 100.7", with the call letters changing to WUKS. In 1998, the call letters were changed to WAKS. During the "Kiss" era, the station was the home of the popular, locally syndicated Mason Dixon Morning Show. On August 28, 1999, at midnight, the station became "Mix 100.7", and the call sign changed to WMTX (which was first used on 95.7 FM as "Mix 96"). Community outrage was highly noted in local newspapers and on other radio stations. Under the "Mix" branding, the station flipped to a mainstream adult contemporary format. The station initially carried Casey's Top 20 countdown, hosted by Casey Kasem, and Backtrax USA. The format gradually shifted to Adult Top 40.

iHeartMedia ownership
Both WMTX and its AM counterpart, WDAE, were acquired by Clear Channel Communications in 1999.  In 2019, for the first time in its history, WMTX flipped to all-Christmas music for the holiday season, a week before WDUV or Joy FM (88.1, 91.5 and 91.7) usually flip to all-Christmas.

In 2020, WMTX shifted from Adult Top 40, returning to adult contemporary music, but still calling itself "Mix 100.7."

Signal
WMTX transmits from a tower in Riverview, Florida, shared with six other FM radio stations, and nearly all of the TV stations serving Tampa Bay. WMTX's signal is powered at 100,000 watts, the maximum for most stations in Florida. With a good radio, the station can be heard as far away as Orlando and Cape Coral.

WMTX-HD2

In early 2007, WMTX launched an HD2 digital subchannel with a Soft AC format.  On December 17, 2007, WMTX HD-2 dropped the Soft AC format to introduce the LGBTQ-oriented "Pride Radio" service, featuring Dance and Rhythmic Hits.

On January 28, 2013, WMTX-HD2 changed its format to classic rock, branded as "Thunder Tampa Bay", and began to be relayed on FM translators W233AV 94.5 (Gulfport) and W290BJ 105.9 (West Tampa). On September 24, 2014, WMTX-HD2 started simulcasting on W256CT 99.1 (Bayonet Point). In the Fall of 2015, WMTX-HD2 began simulcasting on translator W275AZ 102.9 (Wesley Chapel South). The "Thunder" branding and format was previously used on sister station WTBT 105.5/103.5 (now WFUS) from 1995 to 2005.

On June 3, 2016, WMTX-HD2 shifted its format to classic hits, still branded as "Thunder Tampa Bay". However, one month later, WMTX-HD2 returned to classic rock, still branded as "Thunder Tampa Bay".

On December 13, 2016, WMTX-HD2 flipped to classic hip hop as "Throwback 94.5 & 105.9", complementing Urban Contemporary sister station WBTP.

On January 11, 2019, WMTX-HD2 announced that it would be changing its format the following Monday, and began directing listeners to WBTP. On January 14, W233AV, W256CT and W290BJ began simulcasting news/talk-formatted WFLA.  The classic hip hop format continued on WMTX's HD2 sub-channel, with the HD3 subchannel carrying "The Breeze," a Soft AC format from iHeartRadio.

On July 26, 2021, WMTX-HD2 changed their format to a simulcast of Spanish news/talk-formatted WHNZ, branded as "Acción 1250".

References

External links
WMTX Website

Mainstream adult contemporary radio stations in the United States
MTX
IHeartMedia radio stations
Radio stations established in 1947
1947 establishments in Florida